Brenton McKenzie (born 10 September 1955) is a Jamaican cricketer. He played in one first-class and one List A match for the Jamaican cricket team in 1984/85.

See also
 List of Jamaican representative cricketers

References

External links
 

1955 births
Living people
Jamaican cricketers
Jamaica cricketers
People from Saint Thomas Parish, Jamaica